Robert Kimoff (c. 1932 – September 9, 2003) was a Canadian football player who played for the Edmonton Eskimos. He won the Grey Cup with the Eskimos in 1955 and 1956. He was an alumnus of the University of Toronto. In 2003, he died of cancer at Foothills Hospital in Calgary.

References

1932 births
2003 deaths
Toronto Varsity Blues football players
Edmonton Elks players
Canadian football people from Toronto
Players of Canadian football from Ontario